Jessica Leccia , ; (born January 8, 1976) is an American actress. She is known for her portrayals of Natalia Rivera on Guiding Light from 2007 to 2009 and of Inez Salinger on One Life to Live from 2010 to 2011.

Early life and education
Leccia was born in New York City, New York. She received a B.A. from Bloomsburg University.

Career
Leccia is best known for her portrayal of Natalia Rivera Aitoro on the American daytime drama Guiding Light. Prior to joining Guiding Light, Leccia had a recurring role on the television show Rescue Me starring Denis Leary. Leccia also guest-starred on the American daytime drama As the World Turns.

Leccia joined the cast of Guiding Light on April 25, 2007, as Natalia Rivera, Gus Aitoro's long lost high school sweetheart. Leccia's character Natalia was paired with Crystal Chappell's character Olivia Spencer during the last several months of Guiding Light, which ended its 72-year run on 18 September 2009.

Leccia worked with Guiding Light castmate Chappell again on Chappell's new webseries, Venice: The Series, in which she played Ani, a photographer and ex-girlfriend of Chappell's character, Gina. Along with Chappell and Leccia, other Guiding Light stars Jordan Clarke, Tina Sloan, and Gina Tognoni joined the cast of Venice. Venice aired its first episode on December 4, 2009.

Leccia also made appearances on Law & Order: Trial by Jury and Love Monkey.

From June 2010 to May 2011, Leccia portrayed Inez Salinger on One Life to Live and also as Ivy on The Grove: The Series.

Personal life
She has been married to Brian Malloy since May 3, 2008. The couple welcomed their daughter Ivy Lola Malloy, on June 10, 2009.

Leccia has said that she enjoys watching the television series Lost and that her favorite singer is Stevie Wonder.

Filmography

Awards

Nominated
 2008 ALMA Award Outstanding Performance in a Daytime Drama Series (Guiding Light)

See also
Olivia Spencer and Natalia Rivera Aitoro
List of supercouples

References

External links
The Official Jessica Leccia Website

Actor Profile from SoapCentral

Bloomsburg University of Pennsylvania alumni
American soap opera actresses
Living people
1976 births
21st-century American actresses